Brandon Onkony (born 2 December 1997) is a Swiss professional footballer. He plays for Chiasso.

Career

Youth
Onkony played for Montreux Sports and Lausanne-Sports, in his native Switzerland as a youth player.

In 2015 he joined Montreal Impact's Academy U18. He played 15 games for 1 goal and helped the team to reach the Playoffs.

FC Montreal
On 10 June 2016 FC Montreal announced the signing of Onkony to an Academy contract, although he was promoted to play with the USL professional team  He made his debut against FC Cincinnati the following day, appearing as a substitute in the 76th minute. He made a further 7 appearances for FC Montreal in 2016.

Toronto FC II
On 18 April 2017 Toronto FC II announced the signing of Brandon Onkony to a professional contract. He made his debut in the first game of the season against Phoenix Rising, appearing as a substitute in the 70th minute.

Onkony also spent time with Toronto FC III at the beginning of the season making four appearances.

Hobro IK
Onkony arrived in Denmark in the winter 2019. He spent time with Hobro IK reserves team where he played 6 games and with Kjellerup IF where he played 7 games.

On 3 June 2019 Hobro IK announced, that Onkony officially had joined the club on a one-year contract. Hobro confirmed in July 2020, that they did not agree on the terms of a new contract and that he would not extend his stay at the club.

FC Helsingør
On the 24 August 2020 FC Helsingør announced, that Brandon Onkony had joined the club. He signed a two-year contract with the club. During the two years in Helsingør, Onkony only made seven appearances, before leaving in June 2022, as his contract expired.

Chiasso
On 11 August 2022, Onkony signed with Chiasso.

References

External links

1997 births
Sportspeople from the canton of Vaud
Living people
Association football defenders
Swiss men's footballers
People from Montreux
FC Lausanne-Sport players
FC Montreal players
Toronto FC II players
Kjellerup IF players
Hobro IK players
FC Helsingør players
FC Chiasso players
USL Championship players
Danish 2nd Division players
Danish Superliga players
Swiss Promotion League players
Swiss expatriate footballers
Expatriate soccer players in Canada
Swiss expatriate sportspeople in Canada
Expatriate men's footballers in Denmark
Swiss expatriate sportspeople in Denmark